23436 Alekfursenko, provisional designation , is a carbonaceous Hygiean asteroid from the outer region of the asteroid belt, approximately  in diameter. It was discovered on 21 October 1982, by Russian–Ukrainian astronomer Lyudmila Zhuravleva at the Crimean Astrophysical Observatory, Nauchnyj, on the Crimean peninsula. The likely C-type asteroid has a rotation period of 3.6 hours. It was named after Russian historian Aleksandr Fursenko.

Orbit and classification 

Alekfursenko is a member of the Hygiea family, a very large family of carbonaceous outer-belt asteroids, named after the fourth-largest asteroid, 10 Hygiea. It orbits the Sun in the outer main-belt at a distance of 2.5–3.8 AU once every 5 years and 7 months (2,051 days; semi-major axis of 3.16 AU). Its orbit has an eccentricity of 0.20 and an inclination of 4° with respect to the ecliptic. The asteroid's observation arc begins with its discovery observation in 1982, as neither precoveries nor prior identifications were obtained.

Naming 

This minor planet was named in honor of Russian historian Aleksandr Fursenko (1927–2008), expert in topics such as international relations, U.S. history, and Russian foreign economic policy. He was also a member of the Russian Academy of Sciences. The official  was published by the Minor Planet Center on 24 November 2007.

Physical characteristics

Rotation period 

In November 2010, a rotational lightcurve of Alekfursenko was obtained from photometric observations made by astronomers at the Palomar Transient Factory in California. Lightcurve analysis gave a rotation period of  hours with a brightness variation of 0.42 magnitude. A modeled lightcurve using photometric data from the Lowell Photometric Database and from the Wide-field Infrared Survey Explorer (WISE) was published in 2018. It gave a concurring sidereal period of  hours, as well as a spin axis at (−1.0°, 54.0°) in ecliptic coordinates (λ, β).

Diameter and albedo 

According to the survey carried out by the NEOWISE mission of NASA's space-based WISE spacecraft, Alekfursenko measures 8.4 kilometers in diameter and its surface has an albedo of 0.08, while the Collaborative Asteroid Lightcurve Link assumes a standard albedo for carbonaceous asteroids of 0.057 and calculates a diameter of 8.0 kilometers with an absolute magnitude of 14.22.

References

External links 
 Asteroid Lightcurve Database (LCDB), query form (info )
 Dictionary of Minor Planet Names, Google books
 Discovery Circumstances: Numbered Minor Planets (20001)-(25000) – Minor Planet Center
 
 

023436
Discoveries by Lyudmila Zhuravleva
Named minor planets
19821021